Ezequias Roosevelt Tavares de Melo (born 28 January 1981), known simply as Ezequias, is a Brazilian professional footballer who plays for Independente-PA as a left back.

He played for several teams during his professional career, in Brazil, Portugal and Romania.

Football career
Born in Jundiaí, São Paulo, Ezequias started playing football with lowly Sport Club Corinthians Alagoano. He would then spend the following seven seasons in Portugal, with C.S. Marítimo – where he arrived in 2001 alongside Pepe, later of FC Porto, Real Madrid and the Portugal national team fame – Gil Vicente FC, Académica de Coimbra, Porto, S.C. Beira-Mar and Leixões SC, the latter two loaned by the Primeira Liga club after being unable to impress (only one league appearance, a 1–2 away loss against S.C. Braga).

In the middle of 2008, Ezequias was finally released by Porto and signed with Romania's FC Brașov. Two years later, after two seasons as first-choice, he moved to another team in that country and its Liga I, FC Rapid București.

Personal life
For reasons unknown to him, Ezequias' second name was an homage to American president Franklin D. Roosevelt.

References

External links
 
 
 
 

1981 births
Living people
People from Jundiaí
Brazilian footballers
Association football defenders
Campeonato Brasileiro Série D players
Sport Club Corinthians Alagoano players
Primeira Liga players
Segunda Divisão players
C.S. Marítimo players
Gil Vicente F.C. players
Associação Académica de Coimbra – O.A.F. players
FC Porto players
S.C. Beira-Mar players
Leixões S.C. players
Liga I players
FC Brașov (1936) players
FC Rapid București players
Brazilian expatriate footballers
Expatriate footballers in Portugal
Expatriate footballers in Romania
Brazilian expatriate sportspeople in Portugal
Brazilian expatriate sportspeople in Romania
Trem Desportivo Clube players
Footballers from São Paulo (state)